The Passerelle Simone-de-Beauvoir (initially known by the provisional name of passerelle Bercy-Tolbiac) is a bridge solely for pedestrians and cyclists across the Seine River in Paris. It is the 37th bridge on the Seine in Paris. It is located between the bridges of Pont de Bercy and Pont de Tolbiac and links up the 12th and 13th arrondissements of Paris. Its nearest Paris Metro station is Quai de la Gare.

History

The span was constructed by the Eiffel company (Eiffel Constructions métalliques) in the Alsace and was transported by canal, the North Sea, the English Channel and French rivers (with difficulties due to sluices being too narrow) to its destination, crossing Paris on a barge on November 30, 2005. It was hoisted in place in two hours on January 29, 2006, around three o'clock in the morning. The passerelle is characteristic of its time and distinguishes itself from the three other footbridges that already cross the Seine in Paris (Passerelle Léopold-Sédar-Senghor formerly Passerelle Solférino, Pont des Arts, and Passerelle Debilly). The geometry of its members reduces shearing. This is a lens-shaped structure. The rotational anchorage on its supports brings its structural height back down to the different levels of the quais at either end. Its five crossings pass over the river without supports in water. It rejoins the streets on the high bank (directly into the parvise of the Bibliothèque François-Mitterrand (new Bibliothèque nationale de France), on the Rive Gauche (left bank), and directly into the parc de Bercy on the Rive Droite (right bank). It has double supports on the lower banks (quai François-Mauriac on the rive gauche, and quai de Bercy on the rive droite). A protected area mid-way at the central lens allows pedestrians to shelter from rain.

In March 2005, Bertrand Delanoë, the mayor of Paris, proposed naming it "Passerelle Simone de Beauvoir" and inaugurated the bridge on July 13, 2006, with de Beauvoir's adoptive daughter Sylvie Le Bon-de Beauvoir in attendance.

Timeline
 September 2004: network deviation 
 October 2004: foundations laid
 2005 - 2006: links set up one by one
 June 2006: dynamic and static works
 July 2006: inaugurated and opened to the public

Galerie

See also
List of crossings of the River Seine

Bibliography 
Feichtinger Architectes, Passerelle Simone de Beauvoir, Paris, AAM Editions 2007,

External links
  	 
 Ville de Paris
 Feichtinger Architects
Architectural review and photos by a+t architecture publishers

Buildings and structures in the 12th arrondissement of Paris
Buildings and structures in the 13th arrondissement of Paris
Simone-de-Beauvoir
Simone-de-Beauvoir
Simone-de-Beauvoir
Cyclist bridges